3130 may refer to:

In general
 A.D. 3130, a year in the 4th millennium CE
 3130 BC, a year in the 4th millennium BCE
 3130, a number in the 3000 (number) range

Places
 3130 Hillary, an asteroid in the Asteroid Belt, the 3130th asteroid registered
 Hawaii Route 3130, a state highway
 Louisiana Highway 3130, a state highway
 Texas Ranch to Market Road 3130, a state highway

Other uses
 Dirgantara Air Service Flight 3130, a 2000 Indonesian crash with no deaths

See also